Wyndham Leslie Trevor Jenkins (26 August 1898 – 14 June 1971) was a Welsh cricketer.  Jenkins was a right-handed batsman who played primarily as a wicket-keeper. He was born at Newport, Monmouthshire.

Jenkins represented Glamorgan in 10 first-class in 1921, making his debut against Gloucestershire at St. Helen's and playing his final first-class match for the county against Hampshire at Cardiff Arms Park. In his 10 first-class matches he scored 155 runs at a batting average of 8.15 and a high score of 39.  Behind the stumps he took 8 catches and made 2 stumpings.

Jenkins died at Penarth, Glamorgan on 14 June 1898.

References

External links
Leslie Jenkins at Cricinfo
Leslie Jenkins at CricketArchive

1898 births
1971 deaths
Sportspeople from Newport, Wales
Welsh cricketers
Glamorgan cricketers
Wicket-keepers